"Nothing Like the Rain" is a song recorded by Belgian/Dutch Eurodance band 2 Unlimited. It was released on 10 June 1995 as the fourth and final single from their third album, Real Things (1994). In the US, the song was released as a double a-side single with the European hit single "Here I Go". It peaked within the Top 20 in at least four countries, and was also the first single by 2 Unlimited that was a pop-ballad. The single was not released in the UK.

Critical reception
Pop Rescue called the song "brilliant", describing it as "a slow, gentle, beautiful ballad, and it really gives Anita the room to show off her vocals."

Chart performance
"Nothing Like the Rain" was a moderate success on the charts in Europe, reaching the Top 10 in the band's native Netherlands, peaking at number six. Additionally, it made it to the Top 20 in Finland, Norway and Spain, while it reached the Top 30 in Belgium. On the Eurochart Hot 100, the single peaked at number 68. It was the first 2 Unlimited single to not receive a UK release, and did not chart on the UK Singles Chart. Outside Europe, "Nothing Like the Rain" peaked at number 134 in Australia.

Music video
The accompanying music video for "Nothing Like The Rain" was directed by Nigel Simpkiss and was released in the UK in June 1995. It features Anita and Ray performing in front of or behind raining water. Other shots are made in a swimming pool. Simpkiss also directed the music videos for "Let the Beat Control Your Body", "The Real Thing" and "Here I Go". "Nothing Like the Rain" was later published on 2 Unlimited's official YouTube channel in July 2014.

Ballads
2 Unlimited included ballads at the end of their three first studio albums:
 "Desire" and "Eternally Yours" on Get Ready!
 "Where Are You Now" and "Shelter For A Rainy Day" on No Limits
 "Nothing Like The Rain" on Real Things
 "Nothing Like The Rain" was the only ballad the band released as a single.

Track listing

 7" single
 "Nothing Like The Rain" (Airplay Edit) (3:59)
 "Nothing Like The Rain" (Rainy Edit) (3:43)

 12" single maxi
 "Nothing Like The Rain" (Rainy Remix) (5:49)
 "Nothing Like The Rain" (Rainy Edit) (3:43)
 "No Limit" (X-Out '95) (5:59)

 CD single
 "Nothing Like The Rain" (Airplay Edit) (3:59)
 "Nothing Like The Rain" (Rainy Edit) (3:43)

 CD maxi
 "Nothing Like The Rain" (Airplay Edit) (3:59)
 "Nothing Like The Rain" (Rainy Edit) (3:43)
 "Nothing Like The Rain" (Rainy Remix) (5:49)
 "No Limit" (X-Out '95) (5:59)

Charts

Weekly charts

Year-end charts

References

External links
 A-Lyric: an explanation of "Nothing Like the Rain" lyrics by the lyricist.

1994 songs
1995 singles
2 Unlimited songs
Trip hop songs
Songs written by Phil Wilde
Songs written by Peter Bauwens
Byte Records singles
Pop ballads
1990s ballads
Music videos directed by Nigel Simpkiss